Pseudanarta crocea is a moth of the family Noctuidae. It is found from Saskatchewan, Alberta and British Columbia south through Colorado and Utah to California, and Arizona.

The wingspan is about 22 mm.

External links
Images

Xyleninae
Moths of North America
Moths described in 1875